Taeniogonalos is a genus of wasps in the family Trigonalidae.

Species
There are 53 or so described species, including:

 Taeniogonalos alticola (Tsuneki, 1991)
 Taeniogonalos bucarinata Chen, van Achterberg, He & Xu, 2014
 Taeniogonalos chadwicki (Riek, 1954)
 Taeniogonalos cordata Chen, van Achterberg, He & Xu, 2014
 Taeniogonalos enderleini (De Santis 1980)
 Taeniogonalos eurysoma Chen & van Achterberg, 2020
 Taeniogonalos fasciata (Strand, 1913)
 Taeniogonalos fasciatipennis (Cameron, 1897)
 Taeniogonalos flavicincta (Bischoff, 1913)
 Taeniogonalos flavocincta (Teranishi, 1929)
 Taeniogonalos flavoscutellata (Chen, 1949)
 Taeniogonalos geminata Chen, van Achterberg, He & Xu, 2014
 Taeniogonalos gestroi Schulz, 1906
 Taeniogonalos gracilicornis (Strand, 1912)
 Taeniogonalos gundlachii (Cresson, 1865)
 Taeniogonalos henicospili (Rohwer, 1929)
 Taeniogonalos intermedia (Chen, 1949)
 Taeniogonalos javana (Bischoff, 1933)
 Taeniogonalos jucunda (Westwood, 1868)
 Taeniogonalos kerala (Ayyar, 1919)
 Taeniogonalos lachrymosa (Westwood, 1874)
 Taeniogonalos lugubris (Westwood, 1868)
 Taeniogonalos maculata (Smith, 1851)
 Taeniogonalos maga (Teranishi, 1929)
 Taeniogonalos maschuna (Schulz, 1907)
 Taeniogonalos maynei (Benoit, 1950)
 Taeniogonalos mongolica (Popov, 1945)
 Taeniogonalos ornata (Smith, 1861)
 Taeniogonalos pictifrons (Smith, 1861)
 Taeniogonalos pictipennis (Strand, 1914)
 Taeniogonalos raymenti Carmean & Kimsey, 1998
 Taeniogonalos rufofasciata (Chen, 1949)
 Taeniogonalos sauteri (Bischoff, 1933)
 Taeniogonalos schulzi (Bischoff, 1933)
 Taeniogonalos sculpturata Chen, van Achterberg, He & Xu, 2014
 Taeniogonalos semibrunnea (Bischoff, 1951)
 Taeniogonalos subtruncata Schulz, 1906
 Taeniogonalos taihorina (Bischoff, 1914)
 Taeniogonalos tenebrosa (Riek, 1954)
 Taeniogonalos thwaitesii (Westwood, 1874)
 Taeniogonalos triangulata Chen, van Achterberg, He & Xu, 2014
 Taeniogonalos tricolor Chen, 1949
 Taeniogonalos tricolorisoma Chen, van Achterberg, He & Xu, 2014
 Taeniogonalos uncifera Chen, van Achterberg, He & Xu, 2014
 Taeniogonalos venatoria (Riek, 1962)
 Taeniogonalos woodorum (Smith, 2012)
 Taeniogonalos zairensis (Benoit, 1950)
 Taeniogonalos zimmeri (Bischoff, 1933)

References

Parasitica
Hymenoptera genera